A web developer is a programmer who develops World Wide Web applications using a client–server model. The applications typically use HTML, CSS, and JavaScript in the client, and any general-purpose programming language in the server. HTTP is used for communications between client and server. A web developer may specialize in client-side applications (Front-end web development), server-side applications (back-end development), or both (full-stack development).

Prerequisite   

There are no formal educational or license requirements to become a web developer. However, many colleges and trade schools offer coursework in web development. There are also many tutorials and articles which teach web development, often freely available on the web - for example, on JavaScript.

Even though there are no formal requirements, web development projects require web developers to have knowledge and skills such as:
 Using HTML, CSS, and JavaScript
 Programming/coding/scripting in one of the many server-side languages or frameworks
 Understanding server-side/client-side architecture and communication of the kind mentioned above
 Ability to utilize a database

See also 
 Frontend and backend
 Outline of web design and web development
 User interface
 User experience
 Website design
 Web development
 Software developer

References

External links 

 The US Department of Labor's description of Web Developers
 / World Wide Web Consortium (W3C)

Web development
Computer occupations